Yusneylys Guzmán Lopez (born 8 August 1996) is a Cuban freestyle wrestler. She is a silver medalist at the Pan American Games and a gold medalist at the Pan American Wrestling Championships. She is also a two-time medalist at the Central American and Caribbean Games. She also competed in the women's 50 kg event at the 2020 Summer Olympics held in Tokyo, Japan.

Career 

She competed at the Central American and Caribbean Games both in 2014 and in 2018: she won the silver medal in the women's 48 kg event in 2014 and she won one of the bronze medals in the 50 kg event in 2018.

In 2015, she represented Cuba at the Pan American Games held in Toronto, Canada in the 48 kg event without winning a medal. She lost her bronze medal match against Alyssa Lampe of the United States. The following year, she competed in the 2016 Pan American Wrestling Olympic Qualification Tournament without qualifying for the 2016 Summer Olympics in Rio de Janeiro, Brazil. In this competition, she also lost her bronze medal match against Alyssa Lampe.

In 2019, she won the gold medal in the 50 kg event at the Pan American Wrestling Championships held in Buenos Aires, Argentina. She won the silver medal in the 50 kg event at the 2019 Pan American Games held in Lima, Peru. In that same year, she also competed in the 50 kg event at the 2019 World Wrestling Championships where she was eliminated in her first match.

In March 2020, she qualified at the Pan American Olympic Qualification Tournament held in Ottawa, Canada to represent Cuba at the 2020 Summer Olympics. She competed in the women's 50 kg event at the 2020 Summer Olympics held in Tokyo, Japan.

Achievements

Notes

References

External links 
 

Living people
1996 births
Place of birth missing (living people)
Cuban female sport wrestlers
Pan American Games medalists in wrestling
Pan American Games silver medalists for Cuba
Medalists at the 2019 Pan American Games
Wrestlers at the 2015 Pan American Games
Wrestlers at the 2019 Pan American Games
Central American and Caribbean Games silver medalists for Cuba
Central American and Caribbean Games bronze medalists for Cuba
Competitors at the 2014 Central American and Caribbean Games
Competitors at the 2018 Central American and Caribbean Games
Central American and Caribbean Games medalists in wrestling
Pan American Wrestling Championships medalists
Wrestlers at the 2020 Summer Olympics
Olympic wrestlers of Cuba
21st-century Cuban women